Urh is a small settlement in the Pohorje Hills in the Municipality of Slovenska Bistrica in northeastern Slovenia. The area is part of the traditional region of Styria. It is now included with the rest of the municipality in the Drava Statistical Region.

Name
The name of the settlement was changed from Sveti Urh (literally, 'Saint Ulrich') to Urh (literally, 'Ulrich') in 1952. The name was changed on the basis of the 1948 Law on Names of Settlements and Designations of Squares, Streets, and Buildings as part of efforts by Slovenia's postwar communist government to remove religious elements from toponyms.

Church
The local church, from which the settlement gets its name, is dedicated to Saint Ulrich and belongs to the Parish of Tinje. It dates to the 17th century.

References

External links

Urh at Geopedia

Populated places in the Municipality of Slovenska Bistrica